Arey or Sain Aregius may refer to:

Aredius of Gap (575–605), Bishop of Gap
Aredius of Limoges (c. 510–591), Abbot of Limoges
Arey (company), a Russian security, surveillance and aerospace manufacturer
Harriett Ellen Grannis Arey (1819–1901), American educator, author, editor, publisher